Kinesin heavy chain isoform 5C is a protein that in humans is encoded by the KIF5C gene.

References

Further reading

External links 
 

Human genes
Human proteins
Motor proteins